Carlos Viver (born 24 April 1973) is a Spanish former handball player and current head coach of the Spanish women's national team.

On 23 February 2017, he replaced Jorge Dueñas as head coach of Spain national team.

Trophies

Player
 Granollers
EHF Cup: 1994–1995, 1995–1996
Copa ASOBAL: 1994

Manager 
 Spain (w)
Mediterranean Games: 2018

References

1973 births
Living people
Sportspeople from Granollers
Handball players from Catalonia
BM Granollers players
Spanish handball coaches
Mediterranean Games gold medalists for Spain
Liga ASOBAL players
Handball coaches of international teams
Mediterranean Games medalists in handball
Competitors at the 2018 Mediterranean Games
Spanish expatriate sportspeople in Romania